The James Scott Memorial Fountain is a monument located in Belle Isle Park, in Detroit, Michigan. Designed by architect Cass Gilbert and sculptor Herbert Adams, the fountain was completed in 1925 at a cost of $500,000. The fountain honors the controversial James Scott, who left $200,000 to the City of Detroit for a fountain in tribute to himself.

History
Scott was left a sizable fortune by his father who invested in Detroit real estate. According to contemporaries, Scott gambled and told off-color stories. He was described by twentieth-century author W. Hawkins Ferry as a "vindictive, scurrilous misanthrope" who attempted to intimidate his business competitors and when this was unsuccessful, he filed suit. Perhaps for these reasons, Scott died in 1910 with no heirs or colleagues and he bequeathed his estate to the City of Detroit with the condition that the fountain include a life-sized bronze statue of him. Some accounts state that the will required that the statue be at the fountain's pinnacle.

Several community and religious leaders—including Bishop Charles D. Williams—spoke against accepting the bequest, saying that a person with Scott's reputation should not be immortalized in the city. Mayor Philip Breitmeyer and City Council President David Heineman urged accepting the gift, saying that the city shouldn't insult any of its citizens by refusing such a generous offer.

While the debate raged, Scott's fortune continued to grow, topping $1 million by the time construction commenced.

Since 2018, the Detroit Grand Prix INDYCAR race has used the Fountain as its podium backdrop. Drivers are known to dip into the fountain after a race win.

Design 
The monument is located in Belle Isle Park, in Detroit, Michigan. Designed by architect Cass Gilbert and sculptor Herbert Adams, the marble fountain was completed in 1925 at a cost of $500,000. The final design placed Scott's statue in inconspicuous spot behind the fountain.

Movie appearances
A famous scene from the 1973 drama Scarecrow, starring Gene Hackman and Al Pacino was filmed here. In the scene shortly after learning of the death of his estranged son (though falsified by the mother), Pacino's character Francis Lionel 'Lion' Delbuchi, happily plays with a group of children before, upon uncovering a deep emotional truth, he snatches one of them up and begins to ascend the fountain. He is left catatonic in a hospital following the incident.

The fountain is also featured briefly in Anthony Mann's 1947 film noir T-Men, photographed by John Alton. Early in the film, two Treasury Agents preparing to go undercover discuss Detroit criminal gangs and gang activities while standing in front of the fountain.

Gallery

References

Further reading

External links
 Historic Detroit — James Scott Memorial Fountain

Buildings and structures completed in 1925
Fountains in Michigan
Monuments and memorials in Detroit
Cass Gilbert buildings
Belle Isle Park (Michigan)